West Lafayette Baptist Church (1898–1964), also known as Church of the Good Shepherd (1964–1976), was a historic Baptist church located at West Lafayette, Tippecanoe County, Indiana.  It was built between 1898 and 1901, and was a two-story, cross shaped Gothic Revival style brick building.  It featured a corner bell tower with three-tiered masonry buttresses. The Cynthia Jones Hall was added in 1936-1937 and the church was remodeled in 1951.

It was listed on the National Register of Historic Places in 1979, and delisted in 1984.

References

Baptist churches in Indiana
Former National Register of Historic Places in Indiana
Churches on the National Register of Historic Places in Indiana
Gothic Revival church buildings in Indiana
Churches completed in 1901
Churches in Tippecanoe County, Indiana
National Register of Historic Places in Tippecanoe County, Indiana